Michael Stich defeated Boris Becker in the final, 6–4, 7–6(7–4), 6–4 to win the gentlemen's singles tennis title at the 1991 Wimbledon Championships.

Stefan Edberg was the defending champion, but lost in the semifinals to Stich. Stich won the match 4–6, 7–6(7–5), 7–6(7–5), 7–6(7–2). This match was notable for Edberg holding serve in all 23 of his service games during the match, but still losing the match anyway. The one and only service break of the entire match was in the fifth game of the first set, with Stich serving at 2–2 in that first set and getting broken.

Andre Agassi competed in Wimbledon for the first time since 1987, losing in the quarterfinals to David Wheaton. Agassi had previously refused to play Wimbledon from 1988–1990, due to the All England Club's dress code.

This was the first year in Wimbledon history that there was play on the Middle Sunday, due to bad weather in the first week.

Seeds

  Stefan Edberg (semifinals)
  Boris Becker (final)
  Ivan Lendl (third round)
  Jim Courier (quarterfinals)
  Andre Agassi (quarterfinals)
  Michael Stich (champion)
  Guy Forget (quarterfinals)
  Pete Sampras (second round)
  Michael Chang (first round)
  Goran Ivanišević (second round)
  Emilio Sánchez (first round)
  Andrei Cherkasov (first round)
  Jakob Hlasek (second round)
  Karel Nováček (fourth round)
  Brad Gilbert (third round)
  John McEnroe (fourth round)

Qualifying

Draw

Finals

Top half

Section 1

Section 2

Section 3

Section 4

Bottom half

Section 5

Section 6

Section 7

Section 8

References

External links

 1991 Wimbledon Championships – Men's draws and results at the International Tennis Federation

Men's Singles
Wimbledon Championship by year – Men's singles